Alma is a statutory town in Park County, Colorado, United States. The town population was 296 at the 2020 United States Census. Alma is located West and South of the Denver-Aurora-Lakewood, CO Metropolitan Statistical Area and the Front Range Urban Corridor.

Description

Its post office is located at the highest elevation of any in the country. Alma, which is considered a town and not a city, does not take the title of "highest incorporated city" from Leadville, Colorado. Using administrative boundaries as a measure, not settled areas, in 2006 Winter Park, Colorado became the highest incorporated town due to its annexation of a ski area.

History

The town was named by a merchant named Mr. James, after his wife. Another tradition states the town was named for the daughter of a resident.

Mines
Alma grew as a town around the Buckskin Gulch, where gold was first discovered in the area. As hard rock mines opened on Mount Bross, Mount Lincoln, and Mount Democrat, the population of the area continued to grow. In the 1870s, Alma's population peaked at around 10,000 people.  The area around Alma contains 17,452 mining sites, mostly placer mines.

Approximately two miles from Alma are the remains of the defunct Orphan Boy mine (founded 1861), which produced gold, silver, lead, and zinc over a number of decades.

The historic Sweet Home Mine near Alma, formerly a silver mine, now produces the mineral rhodochrosite.

Geography
Alma is located along State Highway 9.

At the 2020 United States Census, the town had a total area of  including  of water.

Climate
Alma has a subarctic climate (Dfc), or what could be called a subalpine climate due to its elevation, with only two months above the 50° isotherm. Alma is the coldest inhabited town in the Lower 48, having a lower yearly mean than other towns known for their extreme cold temperatures, such as Embarrass, Minnesota. Summers are pleasant, with mild days and chilly nights and have no real growing season due to frosts and occasional summer snow. The wettest months are July and August due to thunderstorm activity. Spring and Autumn are both short, but pleasant overall with cool days and cold nights below freezing. Winters are very cold and snowy, lasting from the end of October to well into April some years. Winter highs are almost always below freezing and lows remaining around zero for 1/3 of the year. Alma's snowpack is usually established during October or very early November and lasts into June most years due to heavy snowfall and low night temperatures allowing the snowpack to keep re-freezing overnight. Alma's high elevation and location helps to limit both extreme minima and maxima. April averages the most snowfall out of any month of the year.

Demographics

As of the census of 2000, there were 179 people, 94 households, and 40 families residing in the town. The racial makeup of the town was 92.74% White, 2.23% Native American, 0.56% Asian, 3.35% from other races, and 1.12% from two or more races. Hispanics or Latinos of any race were 3.35% of the population.

There were 94 households, of which 18.1% had children under the age of 18 living with them, 37.2% were married couples living together, 2.1% had a female householder with no husband present, and 57.4% were non-families. 39.4% of all households were made up of individuals, and 1.1% had someone living alone who was 65 years of age or older. The average household size was 1.90 and the average family size was 2.63.

The age distribution was 12.8% under the age of 18, 5.6% from 18 to 24, 53.1% from 25 to 44, 24.0% from 45 to 64, and 4.5% who were 65 years of age or older.  The median age was 37 years. For every 100 females, there were 132.5 males. For every 100 females age 18 and over, there were 140.0 males.

The median income for a household in the town was $41,563, and the median income for a family was $59,688. Males had a median income of $28,750 versus $26,563 for females. The per capita income for the town was $25,165.  None of the families and 4.3% of the population were living below the poverty line.

See also

 List of municipalities in Colorado
 List of highest towns by country

References

External links

 

Towns in Park County, Colorado
Towns in Colorado